The Bystrzyckie Mountains are a mountain range in Poland, part of the Central Sudetes.

References

Bibliography
 Staffa, M. (ed.), 1992: Słownik geografii turystycznej Sudetów. Tom 14. Góry Bystrzyckie, Góry Orlickie. PTTK "Kraj", Warszawa-Kraków. 294 pp. 
 Staffa, M. (ed.), 1994: Słownik geografii turystycznej Sudetów. Tom 15. Kotlina Kłodzka i Rów Górnej Nysy. I-BIS, Wrocław. 524 pp. 
 Ziemia Kłodzka. Mapa turystyczna 1:50 000. Kartogr. Compass, Kraków. 2004 
 Czerwiński, J., 2003: Sudety. Przewodnik. Kartogr. Eko-Graf, Wrocław
 Lamparska, J., 2003: Sudety Środkowe po obu stronach granicy. Przewodnik inny niż wszystkie. Cz. 2. Asia-Press, Wrocław .

Sudetes
Mountain ranges of Poland